Saint-Étienne-du-Valdonnez is a commune in the Lozère department in southern France.

Demographics

See also
Communes of the Lozère department

References

Saintetienneduvaldonnez
Lozère communes articles needing translation from French Wikipedia